Oksana Ovchinnikova (born 21 July 1971) is a Russian track and field athlete who competed in the javelin throw. She competed in the women's javelin throw at the 1996 Summer Olympics.

References

1971 births
Living people
Sportspeople from Volgograd
Russian female javelin throwers
Olympic female javelin throwers
Olympic athletes of Russia
Athletes (track and field) at the 1996 Summer Olympics
World Athletics Championships athletes for Russia
Russian Athletics Championships winners
20th-century Russian women